The Apple Macintosh—later rebranded as the Macintosh 128K—is the original Apple Macintosh personal computer. It played a pivotal role in establishing desktop publishing as a general office function. The motherboard, a  CRT monitor, and a floppy drive were housed in a beige case with integrated carrying handle; it came with a keyboard and single-button mouse. The Macintosh was introduced by a television commercial entitled "1984" shown during Super Bowl XVIII on January 22, 1984 and directed by Ridley Scott. Sales of the Macintosh were strong from its initial release on January 24, 1984, and reached 70,000 units on May 3, 1984. Upon the release of its successor, the Macintosh 512K, it was rebranded as the Macintosh 128K. The computer's model number was M0001.

Development

1978–1984: Development 

In 1978 Apple began to organize the Apple Lisa project, aiming to build a next-generation machine similar to an advanced Apple II or the yet-to-be-introduced IBM PC. In 1979, Apple co-founder Steve Jobs learned of the advanced work on graphical user interfaces (GUI) taking place at Xerox PARC. He arranged for Apple engineers to be allowed to visit PARC to see the systems in action. The Apple Lisa project was immediately redirected to use a GUI, which at that time was well beyond the state of the art for microprocessor abilities; the Xerox Alto required a custom processor that spanned several circuit boards in a case which was the size of a small refrigerator. Things had changed dramatically with the introduction of the 16/32-bit Motorola 68k in 1979, which offered at least an order of magnitude better performance than existing designs and made a software GUI machine a practical possibility. The basic layout of the Lisa was largely complete by 1982, at which point Jobs's continual suggestions for improvements led to him being kicked off the project.

At the same time that the Lisa was becoming a GUI machine in 1979, Jef Raskin began the Macintosh project. The design at that time was for a low-cost, easy-to-use machine for the average consumer. Instead of a GUI, it intended to use a text-based user interface that allowed multitasking, and special command keys on the keyboard that accessed standardized commands in the programs. Bud Tribble, a member of the Macintosh team, asked Burrell Smith to integrate the Apple Lisa's 68k microprocessor into the Macintosh so that it could run graphical programs. By December 1980, Smith had succeeded in designing a board that integrated an 8 MHz Motorola 68k. Smith's design used less RAM than the Lisa, which made producing the board significantly more cost-efficient. The final Mac design was self-contained and had the complete QuickDraw picture language and interpreter in 64 KB of ROM – far more than most other computers which typically had around 4 to 8 KB of ROM; it had 128 kB of RAM, in the form of sixteen 64-kilobit (kb) RAM soldered to the logicboard.

Smith's innovative design, combining the low production cost of an Apple II with the computing power of Lisa's Motorola 68k CPU, began to receive Jobs's attentions. Jobs took over the Macintosh project after deciding that the Macintosh was more marketable than the Lisa, which led former project leader Raskin to leave the team in 1981. Apple co-founder Steve Wozniak, who had been leading the project with Raskin, was on temporary leave from the company at this time due to an airplane crash he had experienced earlier that year, making it easier for Jobs to take over the program. After development had completed, team member and engineer Andy Hertzfeld said that the final Macintosh design is closer to Jobs's ideas than Raskin's. InfoWorld in September 1981 reported on the existence of the secret Lisa and "McIntosh" projects at Apple.

1984: Debut 

In 1982 Regis McKenna was brought in to shape the marketing and launch of the Macintosh. Later the Regis McKenna team grew to include Jane Anderson, Katie Cadigan and Andy Cunningham, who eventually led the Apple account for the agency. Cunningham and Anderson were the primary authors of the Macintosh launch plan. The launch of the Macintosh pioneered many different tactics that are used today in launching technology products, including the "multiple exclusive," event marketing (credited to John Sculley, who brought the concept over from Pepsi), creating a mystique about a product and giving an inside look into a product's creation.

After the Lisa's announcement, John Dvorak discussed rumors of a mysterious "MacIntosh" project at Apple in February 1983. The company announced the Macintosh 128K—manufactured at an Apple factory in Fremont, California—in October 1983, followed by an 18-page brochure included with various magazines in December. The Macintosh was introduced by a US$1.5 million Ridley Scott television commercial, "1984". It aired during the third quarter of Super Bowl XVIII on January 22, 1984, and is now considered a "watershed event" and a "masterpiece". McKenna called the ad "more successful than the Mac itself." "1984" used an unnamed heroine to represent the coming of the Macintosh (indicated by a Picasso-style picture of the computer on her white tank top) as a means of saving humanity from the "conformity" of IBM's attempts to dominate the computer industry. The ad alludes to George Orwell's novel Nineteen Eighty-Four which described a dystopian future ruled by a televised "Big Brother."

Two days after "1984" aired, the Macintosh went on sale, and came bundled with two applications designed to show off its interface: MacWrite and MacPaint. The Macintosh was the first successful mass-market all-in-one desktop personal computer with a graphical user interface, built-in screen, and mouse. It was first demonstrated by Steve Jobs in the first of his famous Mac keynote speeches, and though the Mac garnered an immediate, enthusiastic following, some labelled it a mere "toy". Apple sold it alongside its popular Apple II series until the others were discontinued in the 1990s. Because the operating system was designed largely for the GUI, existing text-mode and command-driven applications had to be redesigned and the programming code rewritten. This was a time-consuming task that many software developers chose not to undertake, and could be regarded as a reason for an initial lack of software for the new system. In April 1984, Microsoft's MultiPlan migrated over from MS-DOS, with Microsoft Word following in January 1985. Apple introduced the Macintosh Office suite the same year with the "Lemmings" ad; infamous for insulting its own potential customers, the ad was not successful.

Apple spent $2.5 million purchasing all 39 advertising pages in a special, post-election issue of Newsweek, and ran a "Test Drive a Macintosh" promotion, in which potential buyers with a credit card could take home a Macintosh for 24 hours and return it to a dealer afterwards. While 200,000 people participated, dealers disliked the promotion, the supply of computers was insufficient for demand, and many were returned in such a bad condition that they could no longer be sold. This marketing campaign caused CEO John Sculley to raise the price from $1,995 to $2,495. The computer sold well, nonetheless, reportedly outselling the IBM PCjr which also began shipping early that year; one dealer reported a backlog of more than 600 orders. By April 1984 the company sold 50,000 Macintoshes, and hoped for 70,000 by early May and almost 250,000 by the end of the year.

Processor and memory 

The boot procedure and some operating system routines were contained in an additional 64 KB ROM chip. Apple did not offer RAM upgrades. Unlike the Apple II, no source code listings of the Macintosh system ROMs were offered.

The RAM in the Macintosh consisted of sixteen 64k×1 DRAMs. The 68000 and video controller took turns accessing DRAM every four CPU cycles during display of the frame buffer, while the 68000 had unrestricted access to DRAM during vertical and horizontal blanking intervals. Such an arrangement reduced the overall performance of the CPU as much as 35% for most code as the display logic often blocked the CPU's access to RAM. Despite the nominally high clock rate, this caused the computer to run slower than several of its competitors and resulted in an effective clock rate of 6 MHz.

Peripherals 

The built-in display was a one-bit per pixel, black-and-white, 9 in/23 cm CRT with a fixed resolution of 512 × 342 pixels, using the Apple standard of 72 ppi (pixels per inch), a standard that was quickly abandoned once higher resolution screens became available. Expansion and networking were achieved using two non-standard RS-422 DE-9 serial ports named "printer" and "modem", which did not support hardware handshaking. An external floppy disk drive could be added using a proprietary connector (19-pin D-sub). The keyboard and mouse used simple proprietary protocols, allowing some third-party upgrades. The original keyboard had no arrow keys, numeric keypad or function keys. This was an intentional decision by Apple, as these keys were common on older platforms and it was thought that the addition of these keys would encourage software developers to simply port their existing applications to the Mac, rather than design new ones around the GUI paradigm. Later, Apple made a numeric keypad available for the Macintosh 128K. The keyboard sold with the newer Macintosh Plus model included the numeric keypad and arrow keys, but still no function keys. As with the Apple Lisa before it, the mouse had a single button. Standard headphones could also be connected to a monaural jack. Apple also offered their 300 and 1200 baud modems originally released for the Apple II line. Initially, the only printer available was the Apple ImageWriter, a dot matrix printer which was designed to produce 144 dpi WYSIWYG output from the Mac's 72 dpi screen. Eventually, the LaserWriter and other printers were capable of being connected using AppleTalk, Apple's built-in networking system.

Storage 

The Macintosh contained a single 400 KB, single-sided -inch floppy disk drive, dedicating no space to other internal mechanical storage. The Mac OS was disk-based from the beginning, as RAM had to be conserved, but this "Startup Disk" could still be temporarily ejected. (Ejecting the root filesystem remained an unusual feature of the classic Mac OS until System 7.) One floppy disk was sufficient to store the System Software, an application and the data files created with the application. The 400 KB drive capacity was larger than the PC XT's 360 KB 5.25-inch drive, however, more sophisticated work environments of the time required separate disks for documents and the system installation. Due to the memory constraints (128 KB) of the original Macintosh, and the fact that the floppies could hold only 400 KB, users had to frequently swap disks in and out of the floppy drive, which caused external floppy drives to be utilized more frequently. The Macintosh External Disk Drive (mechanically identical to the internal one, piggybacking on the same controller) was a popular add-on that cost US$495. Third-party hard drives were considerably more expensive and usually connected to the slower serial port (as specified by Apple), although a few manufacturers chose to utilize the faster non-standard floppy port. The 128K can only use the original Macintosh File System released in 1984 for storage.

Cooling 

The unit did not include a fan, relying instead on convective heat transfer, which made it quiet while in operation. Steve Jobs insisted that the Macintosh ship without a fan, which persisted until the introduction of the Macintosh SE in 1987. Jobs believed that computers equipped with fans tend to distract the user from completing work. Unfortunately, this was allegedly a source of many common, costly component failures in the first four Macintosh models. This was enough of a problem to prompt the introduction of several third-party, external cooling fan solutions such as the MacFan, the Mac N Frost, the Fanny Mac and the Kensington System Saver. These units fitted inside the Macintosh's carrying-handle slot and produced a forced draft through the computer's existing ventilation holes.

Software 

The Macintosh shipped with the very first System and Finder application, known to the public as "System 1.0" (formally known as System 0.97 and Finder 1.0). The original Macintosh saw three upgrades to both before it was discontinued. Apple recommends System 2.0 and Finder 4.2, with System 3.2 and Finder 5.3 as the maximum. System 4.0 officially dropped support for the Macintosh 128K because it was distributed on 800 KB floppy disks, which could not be used by the 128K.

The applications MacPaint and MacWrite were bundled with the Mac. Other programs available included MacProject, MacTerminal and Microsoft Word. Programming languages available at the time included MacBASIC, MacPascal and the Macintosh 68000 Development System. The Macintosh also came with a manual and a unique guided tour cassette tape which worked together with the guided tour diskette as a tutorial for both the Macintosh itself and the bundled applications, since most new Macintosh users had never used a mouse before, much less manipulated a graphical user interface.

Models 

The computer was released in January 1984 as simply the Apple Macintosh. Following the release of the Macintosh 512K in September, which expanded the memory from 128 KB to 512 KB, the original Macintosh was re-branded Macintosh 128K and nicknamed the "thin Mac". The new 512K model was nicknamed the "fat Mac". While functionally the same, as closed systems, the Macintosh and Macintosh 128K were technically two different computers, with the re-badged 128K containing a completely redesigned logic board to easily accommodate both 128 KB and 512 KB RAM configurations during manufacturing. Though the RAM was still permanently soldered to the logic board, the new design allowed for easier (though unsanctioned) third-party upgrades to 512 KB. In addition, most of the newer models contained the 1984 revision B of the ROM to accommodate changes in the 400 KB floppy disk drive. System software contains support for an unreleased Macintosh 256K.

The increased RAM of the 512K was vitally important for the Macintosh as it finally allowed for more powerful software applications, such as the then-popular Microsoft Multiplan. However, Apple continued to market the 128K for over a year as an entry-level computer, the mid-level 512K and high-end Lisa (and claiming that it could be easily expanded should the user ever need more RAM).

Expansion 
Jobs stated that because "customization really is mostly software now ... most of the options in other computers are in Mac", unlike the Apple II the Macintosh 128K did not need slots, which he described as costly and requiring larger size and more power. It was not officially upgradable by the user and only Apple service centers were permitted to open the case. There were third parties that did offer RAM upgrades and even memory and CPU upgrades, allowing the original 128 kB Macintosh to be expanded to a 4 MB 32-bit data path, 68020 CPU (16 MHz), 68881 FPU (16 MHz), 68851 MMU (16 MHz) with an external SCSI port (with a ribbon cable out the clock battery door, internal SCSI hard drive (20 MB Rodime) and a piezo-electric fan for cooling. This upgrade was featured on a Macworld magazine cover titled "Faster than a Vax" in August 1986. All accessories were external, such as the MacCharlie that added IBM PC compatibility. There was no provision for adding internal storage, more RAM or any upgrade cards; however, some of the Macintosh engineers objected to Jobs's ideas and secretly developed workarounds for them. As an example, the Macintosh was supposed to have only 17 address lines on the motherboard, enough to support 128 KB of system RAM, but the design team added two address lines without Jobs's knowledge, making it possible to expand the computer to 512 KB, although the actual act of upgrading system RAM was difficult and required piggybacking additional RAM chips atop the onboard 4164 chips. In September 1984, after months of complaints over the Mac's inadequate RAM, Apple released an official 512 KB machine. Although this had always been planned from the beginning, Steve Jobs maintained if the user desired more RAM than the Mac 128 provided, he should simply pay extra money for a Mac 512 rather than upgrade the computer himself. When the Mac 512 was released, Apple rebranded the original model as "Macintosh 128k" and modified the motherboard to allow easier RAM upgrades. Improving on the hard-wired RAM thus required a motherboard replacement (which was priced similarly to a new computer), or a third-party chip replacement upgrade, which was not only expensive but would void Apple's warranty. The difficulty of fitting software into its limited free memory, coupled with the new interface and event-driven programming model, discouraged software vendors from supporting it, leaving the 128K with a relatively small software library. Whereas the Macintosh Plus, and to a lesser extent the Macintosh 512K, are compatible with much later software, the 128K is limited to specially crafted programs. A stock Mac 128K with the original 64K ROM is incompatible with either Apple's external 800 KB drive with HFS or Apple's Hard Disk 20. A Mac 128K that has been upgraded with the newer 128 KB ROM (called a Macintosh 128Ke) can use internal and external 800 KB drives with HFS, as well as the HD20. Both can print on an AppleShare network, but neither can do file sharing because of their limited RAM.

OEM upgrades 
By early 1985 much Macintosh software required 512K of memory. Additionally, Apple offered an 800 KB floppy disk drive kit, including updated 128K ROMs. Finally, a Mac 128K could be upgraded to a Macintosh Plus by swapping the logic board as well as the case back (to accommodate the slightly different port configuration) and optionally adding the Macintosh Plus extended keyboard. Any of the kits could be purchased alone or together at any time, for a partial or full upgrade for the Macintosh 128K.

Credits 

The original Macintosh was unusual in that it included the signatures of the Macintosh Division as of early 1982 molded on the inside of the case. The names were Peggy Alexio, Colette Askeland, Bill Atkinson, Steve Balog, Bob Belleville, Mike Boich, Bill Bull, Matt Carter, Berry Cash, Debi Coleman, George Crow, Donn Denman, Christopher Espinosa, Bill Fernandez, Martin Haeberli, Andy Hertzfeld, Joanna Hoffman, Rod Holt, Bruce Horn, Hap Horn, Brian Howard, Steve Jobs, Larry Kenyon, Patti King, Daniel Kottke, Angeline Lo, Ivan Mach, Jerrold Manock, Mary Ellen McCammon, Vicki Milledge, Mike Murray, Ron Nicholson Jr., Terry Oyama, Benjamin Pang, Jef Raskin, Ed Riddle, Brian Robertson, Dave Roots, Patricia Sharp, Burrell Smith, Bryan Stearns, Lynn Takahashi, Guy "Bud" Tribble, Randy Wigginton, Linda Wilkin, Steve Wozniak, Pamela Wyman and Laszlo Zidek.

The Macintosh 128/512K models also included Easter eggs in the OS ROM. If the user went to the system debugger and typed G 4188A4, a graphic reading "Stolen from Apple Computers" would appear in the upper left corner of the screen. This was designed to prevent unauthorized cloning of the Macintosh after numerous Apple II clones appeared, many of which simply stole Apple's copyrighted system ROMs. Steve Jobs allegedly planned that if a Macintosh clone appeared on the market and a court case happened, he could access this Easter egg on the computer to prove that it was using pirated Macintosh ROMs. The Macintosh SE later augmented this Easter Egg with a slideshow of 4 photos of the Apple design team when G 41D89A was entered.

Reception 
Erik Sandberg-Diment of The New York Times in January 1984 stated that Macintosh "presages a revolution in personal computing". Although preferring larger screens and calling the lack of color a "mistake", he praised the "refreshingly crisp and clear" display and lack of fan noise. While unsure whether it would become "a second standard to Big Blue", Ronald Rosenberg of The Boston Globe wrote in February of "a euphoria that Macintosh will change how America computes. Anyone that tries the pint-size machine gets hooked by its features". The computer was indeed so compelling to buyers that one dealer in March described it as "the first $2,500 impulse item".

Gregg Williams of BYTE in February found the hardware and software design (which it predicted would be "imitated but not copied") impressive, but criticized the lack of a standard second disk drive. He predicted that the computer would popularize the 3½ in floppy disk drive standard, that the Macintosh would improve Apple's reputation, and that it "will delay IBM's domination of the personal computer market." Williams concluded that the Macintosh was "the most important development in computers in the last five years. [It] brings us one step closer to the ideal of computer as appliance." In the May 1984 issue Williams added, "Initial reaction to the Macintosh has been strongly, but not overpoweringly, favorable. A few traditional computer users see the mouse, the windows, and the desktop metaphor as silly, useless frills, and others are outraged at the lack of color graphics, but most users are impressed by the machine and its capabilities. Still, some people have expressed concern about the relatively small 128K-byte RAM size, the lack of any computer language sent as part of the basic unit, and the inconvenience of the single disk drive."

Jerry Pournelle, also of BYTE, added that "The Macintosh is a bargain only if you can get it at the heavily discounted price offered to faculty and students of the favored 24 universities in the Macintosh consortium." He noted, however, that the Macintosh attracted people "who previously hated computers... There is, apparently, something about mice and pull-down menus and icons that appeal to people previously intimidated by A> and the like".

Timeline

See also 
 Technical information on the Mac 128K

References

External links 

 
 Macintosh 128K profile, Low End Mac.
 Mac 128K Information page at Mac512.com
 
 The 72PPI Web Resolution Myth
Online attempt at simulating Macintosh System 1
 Mac Essentials, Lost 1984 Videos

 Apple Macintosh before System 7 Macintosh 128K Hardware
 Tips For the 128K Support For 128K Diehard Users
 The M0001 Registry Owners of Vintage Macintosh
 Inside the Macintosh 128K
 The Original Macintosh, anecdotes and the people who made it

128k
128k
Computer-related introductions in 1984
32-bit computers